Brachinus albarracinus is a species of ground beetle from the Brachininae subfamily that is endemic to Spain.

References

Beetles described in 1926
Endemic fauna of Spain
Beetles of Europe
Brachininae